Falsimargarita is a genus of sea snails, marine gastropod mollusks in the family Calliostomatidae.

Description
This genus differs from the other genera in the family Calliostomatidae by several characteristics: the conspicuous spiral whorls, obvious sculpture, an open umbilicus, a thin shell and external iridescence.

Distribution
The species of this cold-water genus occurs in Antarctic waters and off the Magellanic Region of South America.

Species
Species within the genus Falsimargarita include:

 Falsimargarita atlantoides (Quinn, 1992)
 Falsimargarita benthicola Dell, 1990
 Falsimargarita callista B. A. Marshall, 2016
 Falsimargarita challengerica B. A. Marshall, 2016
 Falsimargarita coriolis B. A. Marshall, 2016
 Falsimargarita coronata (Quinn, 1992)
 Falsimargarita eximia B. A. Marshall, 2016
 Falsimargarita gemma (E.A. Smith, 1915)
 Falsimargarita georgiana Dell, 1990
 Falsimargarita glaucophaos (Barnard, 1963)
 Falsimargarita imperialis (Simone & Birman, 2006)
 Falsimargarita iris (E.A. Smith, 1915)
 Falsimargarita kapala B. A. Marshall, 2016
 Falsimargarita nauduri Warén & Bouchet, 2001
 †Falsimargarita parvispira Quilty, Darragh, Gallagher & Harding, 2016 
 Falsimargarita renkeri Engl, 2020
 Falsimargarita stephaniae Rios & Simone, 2005
 Falsimargarita tangaroa B. A. Marshall, 2016
 Falsimargarita terespira Simone, 2008
 Falsimargarita thielei (Hedley, 1916)

References

 Dell R.K. (1990). Antarctic Mollusca with special reference to the fauna of the Ross Sea. Bulletin of the Royal Society of New Zealand., 27, 1–3,264-285 pp. page(s): 93
 Marshall, B. A. (2016). New species of Venustatrochus Powell, 1951 from New Zealand, and new species of Falsimargarita Powell, 1951 and a new genus of the Calliostomatidae from the southwest Pacific, with comments on some other calliostomatid genera (Mollusca: Gastropoda). Molluscan Research. 36: 119-141

External links
 Powell A. W. B. (1951). Antarctic and Subantarctic Mollusca: Pelecypoda and Gastropoda. Discovery Reports, 26: 47-196, pl. 5-10

 
Calliostomatidae
Gastropod genera